Major General Stanley Ferguson Legge,  (24 April 1900 – 25 July 1977) was a senior Australian Army officer. The son of Lieutenant General James Gordon Legge, he was born in Turramurra, New South Wales and died in Kallista, Victoria.

References

1900 births
1977 deaths
Military personnel from New South Wales
Australian Commanders of the Order of the British Empire
Australian generals
Australian Army personnel of World War II
People from New South Wales
Royal Military College, Duntroon graduates